The Zoological Society of Bangladesh is an academic and scientific society of professional zoologist, devoted and dedicated for scientific inquiry in the field of Zoology. The Zoological Society of Bangladesh (ZSB) was established in 1972. It is the oldest scientific society in Bangladesh. Presently, the Society has more than 1,600 members.

Activities and publications

The objectives of the Society are to promote and advance the science of zoology in all its branches. The Society undertakes a wide range of activities including holding seminar, symposium, annual meeting. Bangladesh Journal of Zoology is an official scientific journal of the Zoological Society of Bangladesh published twice annually in June and December in English. Zoological Society of Bangladesh has launched the Zoology Olympiad in Bangladesh.

Shankhacheel
The Zoological Society of Bangladesh publishes Bangla newsletter Shankhacheel regularly.

Past Presidents and General Secretaries

References

Zoological societies
Learned societies of Bangladesh
Biology societies
Scientific organizations established in 1972
1972 establishments in Bangladesh
Zoology journals